Sigurd Solid was a Norwegian ski jumper who competed in the 1930s. He won a ski jumping bronze at the 1937 FIS Nordic World Ski Championships in Chamonix.

External links

Year of birth missing
Year of death missing
Norwegian male ski jumpers
FIS Nordic World Ski Championships medalists in ski jumping
20th-century Norwegian people